N.O.R.E. (an acronym for Niggas On The Run Eating) is the debut studio album by American rapper Noreaga. It was released on July 7, 1998 under Penalty Records, and debuted with sales of 165,000 in its first week of release, eventually being certified Gold by the RIAA. The album contained the hit single "Superthug" which peaked at #36 on the Billboard Hot 100 and reached #1 on the Hot Rap Singles chart.

The song "The Change" found new fame after then-underground rapper 50 Cent was filmed free-styling over its instrumental. The album's first single and title-track "N.O.R.E.", is featured on the soundtrack of the 2005 video game Grand Theft Auto: Liberty City Stories, as the game was set in 1998, the year the album was released.

Track listing

Charts

Weekly charts

Year-end charts

Certifications

See also
List of number-one R&B albums of 1998 (U.S.)

References

1998 debut albums
Albums produced by the Neptunes
Albums produced by Swizz Beatz
Albums produced by Dame Grease
N.O.R.E. albums
Albums produced by Marley Marl